Waiting for the Punchline is the fourth album by American band Extreme, released in 1995. It is known by fans as a distinctively raw-sounding record—especially when compared to the big production of the two previous albums—with a significant influence from grunge. Due to its lyrics focused heavily on social matters (ranging from religion to fame) it is often cited as a concept album. It is also the only Extreme record to feature drummer Mike Mangini (on three tracks). After the album's tour, the band subsequently disbanded in 1996 when Bettencourt informed Extreme that he was leaving the band to pursue a solo career. After the breakup, singer Gary Cherone also joined Van Halen in the same year as their new singer, but left three years later.

Track listing
All songs written by Gary Cherone & Nuno Bettencourt, except "There Is No God", "Tell Me Something I Don't Know" and "Naked" by Gary Cherone, Nuno Bettencourt & Pat Badger, and "Leave Me Alone" by Gary Cherone, Nuno Bettencourt & Mike Mangini.

Personnel 
Gary Cherone – lead vocals
Nuno Bettencourt – guitars, keyboards, vocals
Pat Badger – bass guitar, backing vocals
Paul Geary – drums 
Mike Mangini – drums on "Hip Today", "Leave Me Alone" and "No Respect"

Charts

Certifications

References 

Extreme (band) albums
1995 albums
A&M Records albums
Concept albums